The 2016 Fermanagh Senior Football Championship was the 110th edition of the Fermanagh GAA's premier club Gaelic football tournament for senior clubs in County Fermanagh, Northern Ireland. The tournament consists of 8 teams, with the winner representing Fermanagh in the Ulster Senior Club Football Championship. The championship had a straight knock-out format.

Derrygonnelly Harps entered as defending champions after their victory over Roslea Shamrocks the previous year.

Derrygonnelly successfully defended their title after defeating Erne Gaels in the final by a point.

Team changes
The following teams have changed division since the 2015 championship season.

To Championship
Promoted from 2015 Intermediate Championship
 Irvinestown St Molaise - (Intermediate Champions)
 Teemore Shamrocks - (Intermediate Runners-Up)

From Championship
Relegated to 2016 Intermediate Championship
 Derrylin O'Connells - (Relegation Play-off Losers)
 Tempo Maguires - (Relegation Play-off Losers)

Bracket

Quarter-finals
All 8 teams enter the competition at this stage. The four winners progress to the semi-finals while the four losers enter the relegation semi-finals.

Semi-finals

Final

Relegation play-offs

References

Fermanagh Senior Football Championship
Fermanagh Senior Football Championship